Bent Max Calvin Viscaal (born 18 September 1999 in Almelo) is a Dutch racing driver who is set compete in the 2023 FIA World Endurance Championship with Prema Racing. He last competed in the 2022 European Le Mans Series for Algarve Pro Racing. He competed in the 2021 Formula 2 Championship driving for Trident Racing, having previously raced in the FIA Formula 3 Championship for MP Motorsport. He is the runner-up of the 2018 Euroformula Open Championship as well as the 2017 F4 Spanish Championship. Viscaal resides in a small Dutch town called Albergen.

Early career

Karting career 
Viscaal made his motor racing debut in karting in 2010 in the Dutch Mini Juniors Championship. In 2011, he became champion in the Mini Juniors class of the Euro Wintercup, and in 2012 he finished second in the Dutch KF3 Championship. From that season he also participated in foreign races, especially in Germany. In 2014 he made his debut in international karting in the European KF Junior Championship. In 2015 he became champion in the German Junior Championship. In 2016, he drove his last season in karts, in which he finished sixth in the OK class of the European Championship.

Lower formulae 
In 2017, Viscaal made the switch to formula racing and made his debut in Formula 4 in both the SMP and Spanish Formula 4 Championships for MP Motorsport. In the SMP championship, he won four races at the Ahvenisto Race Circuit, the Auto24ring and the TT Circuit Assen (twice), finishing second in the final standings with 218 points behind Christian Lundgaard. In the Spanish championship, he won five races at the Circuito de Navarra, the Circuit de Barcelona-Catalunya, the Circuit Paul Armagnac (twice) and the Autódromo do Estoril, yet again finishing second in this championship behind Lundgaard with a 266 points deficit.

Euroformula Open Championship 
In 2018, Viscaal switched to the Euroformula Open Championship to make his Formula 3 debut for the Teo Martín Motorsport team. In a season dominated by Felipe Drugovich, he won a race at Silverstone and finished on the podium in eleven other races, finishing second behind Drugovich with 246 points. He did win the rookie championship with fourteen wins, one second place and one retirement in sixteen races. The Euroformula Open also hosted the Spanish Formula 3 championship, in which Viscaal was also second behind Drugovich with five second places.

FIA Formula 3 Championship 

In 2019, Viscaal switched to the new FIA Formula 3 Championship, where he raced for the HWA Racelab team. He had a reasonable debut season, but only managed to score a fifth place at the Circuit Paul Ricard. With 10 points, he finished fifteenth in the championship. At the end of the year, he drove in a race weekend of the MRF Challenge at the Bahrain International Circuit, winning two of the four races and finishing on the podium in another.

In 2020, Viscaal remained in FIA F3, but this time with MP Motorsport. At the Hungaroring he earned his first podium finish after a time penalty from Logan Sargeant. In the second race of this weekend, he originally took victory, but after two time penalties of five seconds each and a late safety car phase, he was classified seventeenth in the final results. At Silverstone Viscaal scored his first victory after a last-lap battle with Lirim Zendeli. With 40 points, the Dutchman finished thirteenth in the final standings.

FIA Formula 2 Championship 
In 2021, Viscaal switched to the Formula 2 Championship with Trident, partnering Marino Sato. He scored his first points in round three at the Baku Street Circuit where he finished fourth, giving Trident their best race finish in the modern F2 era. Following a point-less round at Silverstone Viscaal finished seventh after having started from 18th in a chaotic first sprint race at Monza, thus propelling him to fourth on the starting grid for the second race. He managed to move up to second by the checkered flag and scored his first ever Formula 2 podium, which was also Trident's first in the FIA Formula 2 era. The following round at the Sochi Autodrom Viscaal was forced to retire in both races after collisions in the opening laps. After a two-month break Viscaal returned to race in the final two rounds of the series. Having stated that the Jeddah Corniche Circuit, which hosted the penultimate round of the season, was "[...] one of the best tracks [he'd] ever driven", Viscaal finished the sprint race in ninth place and ended race 2 in second place. Viscaal left Trident and the series following the season.

Endurance racing career

2022 season 

For 2022, Viscaal switched to endurance racing, citing the high costs of running in formula cars as his main reason. Viscaal starred in his debut race, the opening race of the 2022 European Le Mans Series season, by finishing in second position, des having no more endurance experience than a handful of testing laps. Due to his outstanding performances, Viscaal was invited to participate in the 2022 24 Hours of Le Mans with ARC Bratislava, recording the fastest 50-lap average pace of all 24 Hours race debutants.

2023 season 
In 2023, Viscaal will participate in the FIA World Endurance Championship with Prema Racing in the LMP2 category, teaming up with Juan Manuel Correa, Andrea Caldarelli and Filip Ugran in the No.9 car.

Karting record

Karting career summary

Racing record

Racing career summary

* Season still in progress.

Complete SMP F4 Championship results 
(key) (Races in bold indicate pole position) (Races in italics indicate fastest lap)

Complete F4 Spanish Championship results 
(key) (Races in bold indicate pole position) (Races in italics indicate fastest lap)

Complete Euroformula Open Championship results 
(key) (Races in bold indicate pole position) (Races in italics indicate fastest lap)

Complete MRF Challenge Formula 2000 Championship results 
(key) (Races in bold indicate pole position; races in italics indicate fastest lap)

Complete FIA Formula 3 Championship results
(key) (Races in bold indicate pole position; races in italics indicate points for the fastest lap of top ten finishers)

Complete FIA Formula 2 Championship results 
(key) (Races in bold indicate pole position) (Races in italics indicate points for the fastest lap of top ten finishers)

† Driver did not finish the race, but was classified as he completed over 90% of the race distance.

Complete European Le Mans Series results
(key) (Races in bold indicate pole position; results in italics indicate fastest lap)

Complete FIA World Endurance Championship results 
(key) (Races in bold indicate pole position) (Races in italics indicate fastest lap)

Complete 24 Hours of Le Mans results

References

External links 
 
 

Dutch racing drivers
1999 births
Living people
Spanish F4 Championship drivers
FIA Formula 3 Championship drivers
SMP F4 Championship drivers
MRF Challenge Formula 2000 Championship drivers
FIA Formula 2 Championship drivers
MP Motorsport drivers
Teo Martín Motorsport drivers
HWA Team drivers
Trident Racing drivers
24 Hours of Le Mans drivers
Karting World Championship drivers
FIA World Endurance Championship drivers
Prema Powerteam drivers